Kaja Skrzek (born 12 November 1998) is a Polish diver. She competed in the women's 1 metre springboard event at the 2019 World Aquatics Championships. She finished in 25th place in the preliminary round. In the women's 3 metre springboard event she finished in 37th place in the preliminary round.

References

1998 births
Living people
Polish female divers
Place of birth missing (living people)
European Games competitors for Poland
Divers at the 2015 European Games
21st-century Polish women